Jucu is a commune in Cluj County, Transylvania, Romania. It is composed of five villages: Gădălin (Kötelend), Juc-Herghelie (Zsukiménes), Jucu de Mijloc (Nemeszsuk), commune centre Jucu de Sus (Felsőzsuk), and Vișea (Visa).

Economy
In 2007, Nokia started a €200 million investment in Jucu, building a cellphone factory that had 4000 employees. It had begun production in 2008, but the factory closed in 2011.

German car components manufacturer Bosch also opened a factory in Jucu and a centre dedicated for training students in the dual educational system.

Population
According to the census from 2011 there was a total population of 4,270 people living in Jucu. Of this population, 84.26% were ethnic Romanians and 11.62% were ethnic Hungarians.

Buildings and administration
High-power broadcasting station: 3 masts 165 metres tall. The station broadcasts on 909 kHz with 200 kW and 1152 kHz with 950 kW.

Jucu is administered by a mayor and a local council composed of 13 councilors.

Natives
George Bariț (1812–1893), historian, philologist, playwright, politician, businessman, and journalist, the founder of the Romanian language press in Transylvania

Image gallery

References

Communes in Cluj County
Localities in Transylvania